Bainbridge is both a surname and a given name. Notable people with the name include:

Surname
Beryl Bainbridge (1932–2010), English novelist
Beverley Bainbridge (1940-2016), Australian Olympic swimmer
Bill Bainbridge (born 1922), English footballer
Bob Bainbridge, English footballer
Christopher Bainbridge (1464?–1514), Archbishop of York and Cardinal
Dave Bainbridge, English progressive guitarist and keyboardist
David Bainbridge (artist), English writer
Dionne Bainbridge (born 1978), New Zealand Olympic swimmer
Emerson Bainbridge (1845–1911), British mining engineer and MP
Gilbert Ronald Bainbridge (1925–2003), British nuclear physicist and engineer
Joe Bainbridge, English footballer
Kenneth Bainbridge, American physicist, director of the Trinity test during the Manhattan Project
Lisanne Bainbridge, cognitive psychologist
Merril Bainbridge, Australian musician
Robert S. Bainbridge (1913–1959), New York state senator
Simon Bainbridge, English composer
Simpson Bainbridge (1895–1988), English footballer
Stephen Bainbridge, American corporate law professor at UCLA and blogger
William Bainbridge (disambiguation), several people

Given name
Bainbridge Colby (1869–1950), US Secretary of State
Bainbridge Wadleigh, United States senator from New Hampshire

English-language surnames
English toponymic surnames